Jin Shijia (born 10 November 1986), also known as Kingscar Jin, is a Chinese actor and swimmer.

Jin is noted for playing Lu Zhanbo in the romantic comedy television series iPartment, which was ranked one of the highest ratings in China when it was broadcast.

Early life and education
Jin was born in Shanghai on November 10, 1986, with his ancestral home in Xiangshan County, Ningbo, Zhejiang. During his early years, Jin attended Yong'an School, Shanghai No.62 Meddle School and Shanghai No.62 High School. Jin graduated from Shanghai Theatre Academy, majoring in acting.

In 2003, Jin won the silver medal in Men's 100m Freestyle of the National Youth Championships.

Acting career
Jin starred in a number of successful sequels beginning with iPartment, which gained great popularity among Chinese young generation and Jin quickly rose to prominence. In the comedy television series iPartment, Jin played the role of Lu Zhanbo, a top student who falls in love with the daughter of a billionaire banker.

In 2014, Jin participated in the romantic comedy television series Tiny Times, which adapted from the Chinese novelist Guo Jingming's novel of the same title.

Filmography

Film

Television series

Awards and nominations

References

External links

1986 births
Shanghai Theatre Academy alumni
Male actors from Shanghai
Living people
Swimmers from Shanghai
Chinese male television actors
Chinese male film actors
21st-century Chinese male actors